A. C. McClurg was a stationer, publisher, and book wholesaler for over 120 years in Chicago, Illinois.  The business began in 1844, as Chicago's first stationery store and changed hands several times, often as the result of a fire.  Alexander McClurg came into management of the business at the time of the Great Chicago Fire (1871) and established an interest in fine literature, which was pursued by the company until late in the first decade of the 20th century.  While pursuing interests in fine English literature and the literary magazine, The Dial, perhaps one of the most historically important books published by McClurg's  "Rare Books" section was W. E. B. Du Bois' The Souls of Black Folk (1903).

About a decade after McClurg's death, the company shut down his Rare Books section of the business and pursued popular adventure. It was the original publisher of the Tarzan of the Apes novels and other stories by Chicago author Edgar Rice Burroughs, as well as the Tom Mix stories.  While these books proved very successful, the business model eventually changed again, and from 1922 to 1962, A.C. McClurg was primarily a book wholesaler.

History

The company was founded in Chicago, Illinois in 1844 as W. W. Barlow & Co., which soon changed names to S. C. Griggs & Co. It was briefly known as Griggs, Bross & Co. after William Bross was admitted as a partner in 1848; the partnership dissolved after eighteen months. Alexander C. McClurg, a former law student who moved to Chicago to join the mercantile trade, joined the company in 1859. McClurg joined Griggs as a junior partner after he returned a general from the Civil War. The company building was burned down in the Great Chicago Fire of 1871. After the fire, Griggs sold his share of the company and it became Jansen, McClurg & Co. McClurg became senior partner in 1887 and the company took the name of A. C. McClurg & Co. The company was again destroyed in a fire in 1899, but McClurg financed a new building. McClurg died in 1901, but the company retained his name in subsequent decades.

A. C. McClurg revitalized The Dial magazine in 1880 as a platform of politics and literary criticism. Under Francis Fisher Browne, the magazine gained national prominence, but it was sold three years after Browne's death in 1913. In 1913, A. C. McClurg published its first Edgar Rice Burroughs Tarzan of the Apes book. McClurg would publish the first ten novels of the series. By 1923, the company's operations focused exclusively on wholesaling. The company remained in business until 1962.

Notes

References

External links

 
 Records of the A.C. McClurg Co. at The Newberry Library

Book publishing companies based in Illinois
Defunct book publishing companies of the United States
Publishing companies of the United States
Defunct companies based in Chicago
Publishing companies established in 1844
1844 establishments in Illinois
Publishing companies disestablished in 1962
1962 disestablishments in Illinois